Hilario Barrero (born 1948) is a Spanish writer, translator, professor and poet. He also is a columnist with Fifth Column in The New York Times.

Biography
He was born in Toledo, Castile-La Mancha, Spain, in 1948, and he had 7 sibling. In 1976 Barrero published his first book: Siete sonetos (Seven Sonnets). In 1978, Barrero left Spain and settled in New York City "to work on poetry". He holds a PhD in Philosophy from the University of New York City. He is professor of Spanish at Princeton University. He is currently professor of Spanish at the University of New York City (Borough of Manhattan Community College).

Barrero was Premio Adonáis de Poesía finalist in 1967 and won several literary prizes. Has translated into Spanish several contemporary American poets, including Robert Frost, Donald Hall and Jane Kenyon. He also won the I International Poetry Prize Gastón Baquero for his work In tempore belli on 7 May 1998 and the poetry prize Muskiz lewd Café 2003 with the book The Rockefeller Center elevator.

His awards include also the Feliks Gross Endowment Award, given by the CUNY Academy for the Humanities and Sciences (the award honors emerging scholars for their research and scholarly achievements). His work has appeared in magazines in the United States and Spain, and been collected in several anthologies.

Some of his poems have been translated into English by Gary Racz and published in the journal Downtown Brooklyn Long Island University. He has collaborated, among others, in the following magazines: Aldonza, Clarín, calendering, The height, Grama, Propeller, Hermes, Humerus Bone, Manx, Spanish poetry, Hourglass, Revistatlántica and Turia. Late, came to BMCC in 2003 after teaching at Princeton University.
Since october 2004 to July 2006, Barrero wrote a personal page called De Cuerpo entero the 7th day of each moth. He write a column in the New York Times since July 2006.

In 2007 he began to publish El Diario de Brooklyn (in English: The Dailies of Brooklyn), a book of poetry that speaks about the life of New York and its features (people, scenes, etc), especially the culture.

Works 
The books that he published are:

Books of poetry
  (Seven Sonnets), 1976
  (In tempori belli, Verbum), 1999.
 (in Spanish: Walter and smoke), 2010 
  (Language of Wood: History of brief poetry in English only), 2011.
  (Family book), 2012

Diaries 
  (Of loves and fears, Book of the Pexe), 2005.
  (Of loves and fears, Book of the Pexe), 2005.
  (Brooklyn Days, Book of the Pexe), 2007.
  (Address Brooklyn, Universes), 2009.
  (Brooklyn in White and Black), 2011.

Tales 
  (A smell of sulfur, Book Notes), 2009.

Translations 
  (Pre-textos)(By other way), 2007 
  (Pre-textos) (Delights and Shadows), 2009 
  (Grand Tour) (The lover of Italy), 2009

Anthologies 
 . (Mapa poético) (Views of New York. (Map poetic)), (2000).
 , 2002
  (Urban lines. Reading New York), 2002
  (Skin-word (Sample of Spanish poetry in New York)), 2003
  (Here I had to write), 2004
  (Pins, The haiku in the Spanish poetry last), 2004
  (Spanish Writers in America), 2007
  (The Labyrinth of Ariadne, 10 years of poetry), 2008
  (Light unharmed. Four poets, teachers, Valdediós), 2008
  (Stories for Toledo, Cylea Editions), 2009
  (Antología de poesía erótica) (Erato under the skin of desire (erotic poetry anthology)), 2010 
  (1975–2008) (Windows on the Atlantic: United States-Spain during the post-Franco (1975–2008)), 2011
  (Poetic History of New York in Contemporary Spain) (Cátedra), 2012

Magazines 
He works in Clarín and he has published in Aldonza, Angélica, Arquitrave, Calandrajas, Downtown Brooklyn, El Súmmum, Grama, Hélice, Hermes, Hueso Húmero, Manxa, Poesía española, Reloj de arena, Revistatlántica y Turia.

References

External links
Tesis: Vida y obra de un claro vascón de Toledo : el legado literario de Félix Urabayen(In Spanish)
 El laberinto de Hilario Barrero(In Spanish)
 Reseña sobre “Dirección Brooklyn” de Hilario Barrero(In Spanish)
Selección poética (In Spanish)
 Poemas de Hilario Barrero (In Spanish)
 Diario de Hilario Barrero
 Crisis de papel: Hilario Barrero: La gente, los versos, la vida. 
 La gente, los versos, la vida – La Nueva España – Diario 
 Clarín. Revista de Nueva literatura. Fragmentos de Nueva York, by Hilario Barrero

Spanish poets
People from Toledo, Spain
Living people
Writers from New York City
1948 births
Spanish male poets
Spanish writers in the United States